Stephen Louis Sax (born January 29, 1960) is an American former professional baseball player and coach. A five-time All-Star player, Sax was named the National League Rookie of the Year in 1982 and won the Silver Slugger Award in 1986. He also played for the New York Yankees, Chicago White Sox, and the Oakland Athletics. Sax currently hosts on SiriusXM's MLB Network Radio.

Career
Sax starred at James Marshall High School (now known as River City High School) in West Sacramento, California, from 1975 to 1978. The Los Angeles Dodgers selected Sax in the ninth round of the 1978 MLB draft. Sax was a late season call up in 1981, playing 31 games. Sax broke into the majors as a regular in 1982, earning the National League Rookie of the Year award. Throughout his career, Sax was on the All-Star team five times and had a batting average over .300 in three seasons. He had great success on the basepaths, stealing over 40 bases in six different seasons, finishing with a career total of 444 stolen bases. His best year arguably came in 1986, when he finished second in the NL with a .332 batting average, 210 base hits, and 43 doubles and won a Silver Slugger Award. He also set the Yankees team record for most singles in a season (171 in 1989).

Sax has two World Series rings, both with the Los Angeles Dodgers in 1981 and 1988. Sax was also a higher-up in the Players Association during his career.

Steve Sax Syndrome
Though never regarded as one of the top fielding second basemen in the league, Steve Sax inexplicably became incapable of making routine throws to first base in 1983, committing 30 errors that season. This is referred to in baseball terminology as "Steve Sax Syndrome", the fielder's variant of "Steve Blass disease," named after the Pirates pitcher who suffered a similar breakdown of basic mechanics (also known as "The Yips"). As his accuracy suffered, fans sitting behind the first base dugout began wearing batting helmets as mock protection. (Teammate Pedro Guerrero, an outfielder pressed into service at third base in 1983, once reportedly stated that his first thought whenever he was in the field was "I hope they don't hit it to me", while his second thought was "I hope they don't hit it to Sax.") By 1989, however, Sax seemed to be completely "cured", leading the American League in both fielding percentage and double plays.

Post-career
Sax piloted a new networking site called allsportsconnection.com. Sax has made television cameos, including the "Homer at the Bat" episode of The Simpsons, as well as episodes of Square Pegs, Who's the Boss, Hollywood Squares and Sabrina The Teenage Witch. He has also been on the Fox News show Hannity. Sax played a supporting character in the 1998 movie Ground Control.

He briefly ran for a seat in the California State Assembly 5th District as a Republican in 1996. Sax later dropped out of the race, when his divorce became publicized. A black belt, he was also a part-owner of a martial arts studio in Roseville, California.

He worked as a financial consultant for RBC Dain Rauscher, LLC, in their Roseville, California office. He had approximately 25 to 30 clients, including several athletes. He was a partner in the Sax/Hinman Sports Professional Group at RBC Dain Rauscher providing professional wealth management for sports professionals at every level of all professional sports.

In December 2012 he was named the first base coach for the Arizona Diamondbacks. The Diamondbacks fired Sax on October 8, 2013.

As of 2015, Sax returned to the Los Angeles Dodgers organization as an Alumnus member of the team's Community Relations team.

Sax currently hosts SiriusXM's MLB Network Radio.

Personal life
Steve is the brother of another former Major League Baseball player, Dave Sax, who also played for the Dodgers. He is the father of Lauren Ashley (Sax) Boyd and son John Jeremy Sax.  His nephew David Sax Jr. (son of Dave Sax) was seen on an episode of Intervention in 2015. His son John, a Captain in the United States Marine Corps, was one of five Marines killed in a V-22 Osprey training accident near San Diego, California on June 8, 2022.

See also
 List of Major League Baseball career stolen bases leaders

References

External links

Retrosheet
Venezuelan Professional Baseball League
April 2005 Sacramento Bee article on Steve Sax and his current activities
Interview/story by Steve Sax describing his Steve Sax Syndrome years

1960 births
American League All-Stars
Baseball players from Sacramento, California
Birmingham Barons players
Chicago White Sox players
Clinton Dodgers players
Leones del Caracas players
American expatriate baseball players in Venezuela
Lethbridge Dodgers players
Living people
Los Angeles Dodgers players
Major League Baseball broadcasters
Major League Baseball Rookie of the Year Award winners
Major League Baseball second basemen
National League All-Stars
New York Yankees players
Oakland Athletics players
People from West Sacramento, California
San Antonio Dodgers players
Sportspeople from Roseville, California
Vero Beach Dodgers players
Arizona Diamondbacks coaches
Silver Slugger Award winners
Major League Baseball first base coaches